Lourdes Candini (born 11 February 1966) is a former synchronized swimmer from Mexico.

References 

1966 births
Living people
Mexican synchronized swimmers
Olympic synchronized swimmers of Mexico
Synchronized swimmers at the 1984 Summer Olympics
Synchronized swimmers at the 1988 Summer Olympics
Pan American Games medalists in synchronized swimming
Pan American Games bronze medalists for Mexico
Synchronized swimmers at the 1987 Pan American Games
Medalists at the 1987 Pan American Games